The 54 Division is a division of the Sri Lanka Army. It was established in 1999 to garrison and defend the strategic Elephant Pass and was forced to withdraw north following the Second Battle of Elephant Pass in 2000, after which it was disbanded. The division was reestablished on 10 September 2010, the division is currently based in Thallady in the Northern Province. The division is a part of Security Forces Headquarters – Wanni and has three brigades and six battalions. Major General G.J.A.W Galagamage has been commander of the division since 28 August 2017.

Organisation
The division is currently organised as follows:
 541 Brigade
 24th Battalion, Vijayabahu Infantry Regiment
 21st Volunteer Battalion, Gemunu Watch
 542 Brigade
 25th Battalion, Sri Lanka Sinha Regiment
 15th Volunteer Battalion, Gemunu Watch
 543 Brigade
 25th Battalion, Gemunu Watch
 19th Battalion, Vijayabahu Infantry Regiment

References

2010 establishments in Sri Lanka
Military units and formations established in 2010
Organisations based in Northern Province, Sri Lanka
Sri Lanka Army divisions